Anthony Township may refer to:

Anthony Township, Lycoming County, Pennsylvania
Anthony Township, Montour County, Pennsylvania